Bagrat IV may refer to:

 Bagrat IV of Georgia, King in 1027–1072
 Bagrat IV of Imereti, King in 1589–1590